SB1394 is Creative Labs implementation of IEEE 1394 interface (also known as i.Link or FireWire) and was included on the Sound Blaster Audigy and Audigy 2 family of sound cards. 

Also OEM Audigy card with model number SB0090 is often referred as "Audigy SB1394".

Creative Technology products
IEEE standards
Sound cards